A. E. Roy Hoskins (born c. 1900) was a rugby union player who represented Australia.

Hoskins, a number eight, was born in Sydney and claimed a total of 3 international rugby caps for Australia.

References

Australian rugby union players
Australia international rugby union players
Rugby union players from Sydney
Rugby union number eights